Herbert L. "Bart" Porter was a campaign aide to U.S. President Richard M. Nixon.

Early life 
At University of Southern California, he was a member of Trojans for Representative Government with future Watergate scandal participants Dwight L. Chapin, Tim Elbourne, Donald Segretti, Gordon C. Strachan, and Ron Ziegler.

Watergate
On January 28, 1974, Porter pleaded guilty to the charge of lying to the FBI during the early stages of the Watergate investigation.

References

Living people
1938 births
People convicted of making false statements
People convicted in the Watergate scandal